RKVV Brabantia is a football club from Eindhoven, Netherlands. RKVV Brabantia plays in the 2017–18 Sunday Eerste Klasse C.

In the season 1954/55 RKVV Brabantia played 1 year of professional football in the Eerste Klasse, which can be compared to the Eredivisie nowadays. For financial reasons they were the first club to return to the amateur ranks after that season.

Prior to that, when the sport was still fully amateur based, RKVV Brabantia had some great successes in the mid 1930s. In those days there were still several football associations. One of them was the RKF/IVCB, only for clubs with a Roman Catholic background and the second largest association on national level after the (Koninklijke) Nederlandse Voetbalbond. In 1935/36 and 1936/37 RKVV Brabantia became twice national champions.

References

External links
 Official site

Football clubs in the Netherlands
Football clubs in Eindhoven
Association football clubs established in 1922
1922 establishments in the Netherlands